Anıtlı is a neighbourhood in the Karayazı District of Erzurum Province in Turkey.

References

Villages in Karayazı District